Imre Géra (born 6 March 1947) is a former Hungarian cyclist. He competed at the 1968 Summer Olympics and the 1972 Summer Olympics.

References

1947 births
Living people
Hungarian male cyclists
Olympic cyclists of Hungary
Cyclists at the 1968 Summer Olympics
Cyclists at the 1972 Summer Olympics